Liederbach am Taunus is a town in Hesse, Germany with 8500 inhabitants.

Twin towns
Liederbach is twinned to the following towns:
 Saldus in the Courland region of Latvia
 Verwood in East Dorset, England.
 Villebon-sur-Yvette in the Essonne département of France
 Frauenwald, Thuringia
 Pietrowice Wielkie, Poland

Visual Impressions

References

External links

 Official website
 
 

Municipalities in Hesse
Main-Taunus-Kreis